The 1934 Pittsburgh Pirates season was the second season of the Pirates after formation the previous year. The 1934 Pirates (later renamed in 1940) began the season with a new coach, Luby DiMeolo, but again found themselves finishing in 5th place in the Eastern Division. The Pirates suffered a miserable 2–10 season, in which they were shut out in 6 games and only scored more than 10 points in 2 games.

One point of interest of the season was the arrival of All-Pro and future Hall of Famer John McNally for one season from the Green Bay Packers. However, he did not have much of an impact for the Pirates before returning to the Packers the next season.

This Pirates team also introduced their "jailbird" uniforms. While these uniforms were worn by the Steelers as throwbacks from 2012 to 2016 (albeit with the current colors, making them "bumblebee" uniforms), this was the only year they were used as the team was constantly made fun of for looking like convicts.

Regular season

Schedule

Standings

Game summaries

Week 1 (Sunday September 9, 1934): Cincinnati Reds 

at Forbes Field, Pittsburgh, Pennsylvania

 Game time: 
 Game weather: 
 Game attendance: 14,164
 Referee: 
 TV announcers:

Scoring drives:

 Pittsburgh – Clark 27 lateral from Sorlet after pass from Heller (Kelsch kick)
 Pittsburgh – FG Kelsch 13
 Pittsburgh – FG Niccolai 13

Week 2 (Sunday September 16, 1934): Boston Redskins  

at Forbes Field, Pittsburgh, Pennsylvania

 Game time: 
 Game weather: 
 Game attendance: 17,171
 Referee: 
 TV announcers:

Scoring drives:

 Boston – Malone 16 pass from Hokuf (Battles kick)

Week 4 (Wednesday September 26, 1934): Philadelphia Eagles  

at Forbes Field, Pittsburgh, Pennsylvania

 Game time: 
 Game weather: 
 Game attendance: 11,559
 Referee: 
 TV announcers:

Scoring drives:

 Philadelphia – Hanson 16 run (Hanson kick)
 Philadelphia – Hanson 34 pass from Kirkman (Hajek kick)
 Philadelphia – FG Wiener 17

Week 5 (Wednesday October 3, 1934): New York Giants  

at Forbes Field, Pittsburgh, Pennsylvania

 Game time: 
 Game weather: 
 Game attendance: 13,020
 Referee: 
 TV announcers:

Scoring drives:

 New York – Badgro 25 pass from Newman (Newman kick)
 Pittsburgh – Skladany 28 pass from Heller (kick failed)
 Pittsburgh – Heller 2 run (kick failed)
 New York – Strong 7 run (Newman kick)

Week 5 (Sunday October 7, 1934): Philadelphia Eagles  

at Baker Bowl, Philadelphia, Pennsylvania

 Game time: 
 Game weather: 
 Game attendance: 9,000
 Referee: 
 TV announcers:

Scoring drives:

 Pittsburgh – FG Niccolai 28
 Pittsburgh – Brovelli 5 run (kick blocked)
 Philadelphia – Gonya 4 pass from Barnhardt (Kirkman kick)

Week 6 (Wednesday October 10, 1934): Chicago Bears  

at Forbes Field, Pittsburgh, Pennsylvania

 Game time: 
 Game weather: 
 Game attendance: 19,386
 Referee: 
 TV announcers:

Scoring drives:

 Chicago Bears – Ronzani 6 pass from Burmbaugh (Manders kick)
 Chicago Bears – Feathers 82 run (Manders kick)
 Chicago Bears – Molesworth 2 run (Manders kick)
 Chicago Bears – Johnsos 3 pass from Molesworth (Manders kick)

Week 6 (Sunday October 14, 1934): Boston Redskins  

at Fenway Park, Boston, Massachusetts

 Game time: 
 Game weather: 
 Game attendance: 15,515
 Referee: 
 TV announcers:

Scoring drives:

 Boston – Malone pass from Hokuf (kick failed)
 Boston – Battles run (Wright kick)
 Boston – Battles 19 run (kick failed)
 Boston – Wright 59 run (Wright kick)
 Boston – Pinckert run (kick failed)
 Boston – McPhail 14 fumble return (McPhail kick)

Week 7 (Sunday October 21, 1934): New York Giants  

at Polo Grounds, New York, New York

 Game time: 
 Game weather: 
 Game attendance: 11,000
 Referee: 
 TV announcers:

Scoring drives:

 New York – FG Strong 44
 New York – Strong 2 run (Strong kick)
 New York – Smith 3 run (Molenda kick)
 Pittsburgh – Sortet 21 pass from Vaughn (Kelsck kick)

Week 8 (Sunday October 28, 1934): Brooklyn Dodgers  

at Ebbets Field, Brooklyn, New York

 Game time: 
 Game weather: 
 Game attendance: 8,000
 Referee: 
 TV announcers:

Scoring drives:

 Brooklyn – Grossman 72 punt return (Kercheval kick)
 Pittsburgh – FG Niccolai 50
 Brooklyn – Grossman 26 pass from Cagle (Kercheval kick)
 Brooklyn – Kercheval 15 pass from Montgomery (Kercheval kick)

The game is the first in NFL history to not feature any penalties by either team.

Week 9 (Sunday November 4, 1934): Detroit Lions  

"at University of Detroit Stadium, Detroit, Michigan

 Game time: 
 Game weather: 
 Game attendance: 6,000
 Referee: 
 TV announcers:

Scoring drives:

 Pittsburgh – Skladany 62 pass from Vaughn (Niccolai kick)
 Detroit – F. Christensen 1 run (Clark kick)
 Detroit – Clark 45 run (kick failed)
 Detroit – Ebding 37 pass from Caddel (Clark kick)

Week 10 (Sunday November 11, 1934): St. Louis Gunners  

at Sportsman's Park, St. Louis, Missouri

 Game time: 
 Game weather: 
 Game attendance: 13,678
 Referee: 
 TV announcers:

Scoring drives:

 St. Louis – FG Senn 35
 St. Louis – FG Alford 12

Week 11 (Sunday November 18, 1934): Brooklyn Dodgers  

at Forbes Field, Pittsburgh, Pennsylvania

 Game time: 
 Game weather: 
 Game attendance: 9,087
 Referee: 
 TV announcers:

Scoring drives:

 Brooklyn – Kercheval 23 pass from Cagle (Kercheval kick)
 Brooklyn – FG Kercheval 22

References

Roster

Pittsburgh Steelers seasons
Pittsburgh Pirates
1934 in sports in Pennsylvania